The 2015 Dayton Flyers football team represented the University of Dayton in the 2015 NCAA Division I FCS football season. They were led by eighth-year head coach Rick Chamberlin and played their home games at Welcome Stadium. They were a member of the Pioneer Football League. They finished the season 10–2, 7–1 in PFL play to share the league championship with San Diego. Due to their head to head victory over San Diego, they received the PFL's automatic bid to the FCS Playoffs where they lost in the first round to Western Illinois.

Schedule

Source: Schedule

Game summaries

@ Robert Morris

Duquesne

Kennesaw State

@ Stetson

San Diego

@ Valparaiso

Butler

Jacksonville

@ Morehead State

Marist

@ Drake

FCS Playoffs

First Round–Western Illinois

References

Dayton
Dayton Flyers football seasons
Pioneer Football League champion seasons
Dayton
Dayton Flyers football